Patricia Neske (born 19 October 1966) is an American-born German former competitive figure skater. She represented Germany at the 1992 Winter Olympics, finishing 13th. She won a bronze medal at the European Championships in 1989 and 1992, and is the 1990 German national champion. She also competed at five World Championships, with her best result being a fourth-place finish in 1989.

Personal life
Patricia Neske was born in California to Horst and Ingrid Neske, who had emigrated from Germany. She attended a vocational school learning about banking in Oberstdorf. In 1992, she returned to California where she attended Loyola marymount university and got her accounting degree. She has two kids

Career 
Neske chose to compete for Germany, representing the Düsseldorfer EG. She trained in Oberstdorf, Bavaria, coached by Peter Jonas.

In the 1984–85 season, Neske won silver at the German nationals. She finished 8th in her first appearance at the European Championships and then debuted at the World Championships, placing 12th. Over the next several years, Neske obtained silver and bronze medals at the St. Ivel International (Skate Electric) and bronze medals at Skate Canada International, Nations Cup, International de Paris, and Nebelhorn Trophy. In 1989, she also won her first bronze at the European Championships. She then placed 4th at the World Championships, achieving her career-best World result.

In the 1989–90 season, Neske won gold at the German Championships but did not reach the European podium again until 1992 when she won her second European bronze medal, earning selection for the 1992 Winter Olympics in Albertville, where she placed 13th overall. She retired from competition later that year.

Results

References

1966 births
Figure skaters at the 1992 Winter Olympics
German female single skaters
Living people
Olympic figure skaters of Germany
European Figure Skating Championships medalists
People from Harbor City, Los Angeles
American people of German descent